is a Japanese company headquartered in Shinjuku, Tokyo. It has been involved in the publishing and developing of video games since 1991, and is currently primarily known for operating jorudan.co.jp, a public transport route navigation website.

SNES
GD Leen (May 28, 1991)
Imperium (1992)
Xardion (March 20, 1992)
Musya (April 21, 1992)
Alien vs Predator (1993)
Date Kimiko no Virtual Tennis (伊達公子のバーチャルテニス; "Kimiko Date's Virtual Tennis") (May 13, 1994)
Hisshou 777 Fighter (1994)
Hisshou 777 Fighter ll (1994)
Hisshou 777 Fighter lll (1995)

Game Boy
Battle Bull (November 30, 1990)

Game Boy Color
Hamster Club (1999)
Chase HQ: Secret Police (2000)
Bubble Bobble Classic (2000)
Hamster Club Awasete Chu (2000)
Hamster Club 2 (2000)
Yogi Bear: Great Balloon Burst (2000)
Pop n Pop (2001)
Hamster Club Oshiema Chu (2001)

PlayStation
One on One (1999)
Kickboxing (2001)
Hamster Club i (2002)
Hoshi no Mahoroba (2002)

Game Boy Advance
Space Hexcite: Metal Legend EX (2002)
Fancy Pocket (2002)
Inukko Club: Fukumaru no Daibouken (2002)
Hamster Club: 4 (2003)
Taiketsu! Ultra Hero (2004)
Petz: Hamsterz Life 2 (2007)

PlayStation 2
Baskelian (2003)
Bouken Shounen Club Gahou (2003)

Nintendo DS
The Eigyoudou (2008)
Nippon Futsal League Kounin: Minna no Futsal (2008)

Wii
Sukeban Shachou Rena (October 22, 2009)

References

 Profile at Game Developer Research Institute
 http://andriasang.com/comg4j/ds_futsal_game_delay/

External links
 Official site
 Official site (Japanese)

Video game companies of Japan
Video game development companies
Video game publishers